Bhilali is a Bhil language of India. Two varieties, Bhilali proper and Rathawi (Rathwi), are largely mutually intelligible. A third, Parya Bhilali, is more distant, but is treated as a dialect.

References

Languages of India
Bhil